The Field Army Troops is the name given to those units falling under direct control of Headquarters, Field Army.

2019 Deputy Commander, Field Army, reorganisation 
In 2019, under the Field Army Reorganisation Plan (FARP), the role of Deputy Commander, Field Army was expanded with the moving of several commands and formations (by 2021) coming under direct control of CFA.  Those units included the following:

 Land Operations Command, at Trenchard Lines, Upavon
 Land Warfare Centre, HQ at Waterloo Lines, Warminster Garrison
 16th Air Assault Brigade, HQ at Merville Barracks, Colchester Garrison
 Collective Training Group (also Training Branch, Field Army), at Warminster Garrison
 Field Training Unit

Structure 
On 25 November 2021, the Future Soldier programme was announced, which is due to be completed by 2030 and will reorganise the British Army from bottom to top.  The role of "Field Army Troops" has been described as follows: "Field Army Troops – will centrally command high-demand, low-volume capabilities.  It will consist of 16th Air Assault BCT and the ISR, Medical, and CEMA Effects Groups."  Under the new programme, the term 'Field Army Troops' is to be re-established, and the following to come under Field Army's direct command:

 Field Army Troops, at Marlborough Lines, Andover
 Cyber and Electro Magnetic Activities Effects Group, at Marlborough Lines, Andover
 13th Signal Regiment, Royal Corps of Signals, at Azimghur Barracks, Colerne – Cyber operations
 14th Signal Regiment, Royal Corps of Signals, at Imjin Barracks, Innsworth – Electronic Warfare
 21st Signal Regiment, Royal Corps of Signals, at Imjin Barracks, Innsworth – Electronic Warfare
 Intelligence, Surveillance, and Reconnaissance Group, at Trenchard Lines, Upavon
 2nd Military Intelligence Battalion, Intelligence Corps (Hybrid), at Trenchard Lines, Upavon
 3rd Military Intelligence Battalion, Intelligence Corps (Army Reserve), in Hackney
 Specialist Group Military Intelligence, Intelligence Corps (Army Reserve), at Aldershot Garrison
 Land Image Intelligence Company
 32nd Regiment, Royal Artillery, at Larkhill Garrison (Mini UAS)
 47th Regiment, Royal Artillery, at Larkhill Garrison (Tactical UAS)
 Land Intelligence Fusion Centre, at Marlborough Lines, Andover
 16th Air Assault Brigade Combat Team, at Merville Barracks, Colchester Garrison
 216 Signal Squadron, Royal Corps of Signals, at Colchester Garrison
 Pathfinder Platoon, at Colchester Garrison
 1st Battalion, The Royal Irish Regiment, at Glencorse Barracks, Edinburgh (Light Reconnaissance Infantry)
 2nd Battalion, The Parachute Regiment, at Colchester Garrison (Airborne Infantry)
 3rd Battalion, The Parachute Regiment, at Colchester Garrison (Airborne Infantry)
 4th Battalion, The Parachute Regiment (Army Reserve), in Leeds (Airborne Infantry)
 2nd Battalion, The Royal Gurkha Rifles, at Sir John Moore Barracks, Folkestone (Air Assault Infantry)
 7th Parachute Regiment, Royal Horse Artillery, at Colchester Garrison (Light Artillery, +1 gun battery)
 23rd Parachute Regiment, Royal Engineers, at MoD Woodbridge
 13th Air Assault Support Regiment, Royal Logistic Corps, at Colchester Garrison (+1 squadron)
 16th Air Manoeuvre Medical Regiment, Royal Army Medical Corps, at Colchester Garrison
 2nd Medical Group, at Queen Elizabeth Barracks, Strensall – reduction of 2nd Medical Brigade
 21st Multi-Role Medical Regiment, Royal Army Medical Corps, at Queen Elizabeth Barracks, Strensall
 22nd Multi-Role Medical Regiment, Royal Army Medical Corps, at Queen Elizabeth Barracks, Strensall
 202nd (Midlands) Multi-Role Medical Regiment, Royal Army Medical Corps (Army Reserve), in Birmingham
 203rd (Welsh) Multi-Role Medical Regiment, Royal Army Medical Corps (Army Reserve), in Cardiff
 206th (North West) Multi-Role Medical Regiment, Royal Army Medical Corps (Army Reserve), in Liverpool
 210th (North Irish) Multi-Role Medical Regiment, Royal Army Medical Corps (Army Reserve), in Belfast
 214th (North East) Multi-Role Medical Regiment, Royal Army Medical Corps (Army Reserve), in Newcastle upon Tyne
 215th (Scottish) Multi-Role Medical Regiment, Royal Army Medical Corps (Army Reserve), in Glasgow
 243rd (Wessex) Multi-Role Medical Regiment, Royal Army Medical Corps (Army Reserve), in Keynsham
 254th (East of England) Multi-Role Medical Regiment, Royal Army Medical Corps (Army Reserve), in Cambridge
 256th (London and South East) Multi-Role Medical Regiment, Royal Army Medical Corps (Army Reserve), in Walworth
 306th Hospital Support Regiment, Royal Army Medical Corps (Army Reserve), at Queen Elizabeth Barracks, Strensall
 335th Medical Evacuation Regiment, Royal Army Medical Corps (Army Reserve), at Queen Elizabeth Barracks, Strensall
 Medical Operations Support Unit, Royal Army Medical Corps (Army Reserve), at Queen Elizabeth Barracks, Strensall

Footnotes

Notes

Citations 

Future Soldier
Military units and formations established in 2022